Daniel "Danny" Fernandes (born September 16, 1985) is a Canadian singer and songwriter.

Early life

At 16, Danny Fernandes won two consecutive Rising Star awards in the annual CNE dance contest held at Cherrytree Public School located in Brampton, Ontario, near Toronto. He became the youngest member of the Toronto Raptors' famed Dance Pak and began to appear regularly as a backup dancer in music videos.

Career

2003–2008: Early beginnings and Intro 
After graduating from High School, Danny started playing showcases at clubs in Europe (Germany, Switzerland, and Austria), Fernandes signed with the Canadian CP Records (Capital Prophet Records) and released his debut album Intro. Danny went out on tour across Canada as the opening act for Akon and Sean Kingston.

On October 14, 2008, CP Records released "Curious", featuring Juelz Santana, the first of four singles from Intro. "Curious" was followed by "Private Dancer", featuring Belly; "Never Again"; and "Fantasy", the most successful of the four, peaking at Number 25 on the Canadian Hot 100 and spending 14 weeks on Canadian radio.

Fernandes was also a judge on the TV show Karaoke Star Jr. alongside Tara Oram.

2010–2013: AutomaticLUV 
Fernandes's second album, AutomaticLUV, was released by CP Records on November 2, 2010, with the first single called "Automatic" featuring Belly. The second single off the album was called "Take Me Away" and the third "Hit Me Up" which once again featured Belly and Josh Ramsay from the Canadian band Marianas Trench. The single reached Number 22 on the Billboard Canadian Hot 100 charts and the video single reached Number 1 on the MuchMusic Countdown.

2013–present: Breathe Again and continued work 
He released his third studio album, Breathe Again on August 27, 2013 on CP Records. The album was preceded by the singles "Fly Again (Broken Wings)" and "Come Back Down" the video single reached No. 1 on the MuchMusic Countdown.

Since the release of his third album, Fernandes has still continued to work on new music. In 2015, he released a single called "Gogo" featuring Kevin McCall. In 2016, he released a collaborative single with Tom-E called "Dear Life" featuring iSH. The single was certified Gold by Music Canada.

Personal life 
Danny Fernandes is of Portuguese descent. He has a younger brother named Jonathan and they are both the younger brothers of Canadian artist Shawn Desman (born Shawn Fernandes). He also is a cousin to another Canadian singer Tyler Medeiros, who signed to Danny's former record label CP records.

Accolades 
At the 2009 MuchMusic Video Awards on June 21, 2009, Danny Fernandes won the Best Canadian Pop Video of the Year for Private Dancer directed by Ren, produced by Renaud Stanton Dupré through The Field Inc. production company.
In April–May 2009, he had also been nominated to People's Choice: Favourite New Canadian Artist/Group category and his single "Fantasy" was nominated for People's Choice: Favourite Canadian Video category in the vote leading to 2009 MuchMusic Video Awards.
He was nominated for a Juno at the 2010 Juno Awards in the Best New Canadian Artist category.
In 2010 he won Favourite Pop Canadian Artist at the Canadian Indie Awards.
In 2011 Mike Portoghese – Post-Production/Director, along with Producer: Bruce Carson, Rory Halsall, and Production Company: The NE Inc., won "Best Post Production of the Year" at the MMVA's for Automatic
In 2012 Marc André Debruyne – Director, along with Production Company: The NE Inc., won "Director of the Year" at the MMVA's for Hit Me Up feat. Josh Ramsay & Belly

Discography

Studio albums

Singles

Featured singles

Tours 
Headlining
Fantasy Tour (2009)
AutomaticLuv Tour with JRDN (2010_
Dear Life Asia Tour (2016)
Supporting

 Girlicious – The Girlicious Tour (2008)
 Emily Osment – SodaPOP (2010)

References

External links
Danny Fernandes Official Website

1985 births
Living people
21st-century Canadian male singers
Canadian contemporary R&B singers
Canadian male dancers
Canadian male singer-songwriters
Canadian people of Portuguese descent
Canadian pop singers
Juno Award for Breakthrough Artist of the Year winners
Juno Award for R&B/Soul Recording of the Year winners
Musicians from Toronto